Reidar Kristiansen (19 March 1927 – 11 February 1999) was a Norwegian footballer. He played in 15 matches for the Norway national football team from 1955 to 1959.

References

1927 births
1999 deaths
Sportspeople from Fredrikstad
Norwegian footballers
Lisleby FK players
Fredrikstad FK players
Norway international footballers
Association football midfielders
20th-century Norwegian people